Myrtartona coronias is a species of moth in the family Zygaenidae. It is found in eastern and south-eastern Australia, from southern Queensland to Tasmania.

The head, thorax, abdomen and upperside of the forewing are dark greyish black with distinct bluish green sheen. The hindwings are dark grey-brown, sometimes with a weak blue-green sheen near the anal angle. The underside of both wings is dark grey-brown with a weak blue-green sheen on the forewing apically and on the hindwing along the costa apically. Females are similar to males but have narrower and more rounded wings.

The larvae feed on Melaleuca species and possibly Kunzea ambigua and the flowers and buds of Leptospermum juniperinum.

References

Moths described in 1886
Endemic fauna of Australia
Procridinae